There are two notable people who have been known as Baron von Manteuffel:

Edwin Freiherr von Manteuffel (1809-1885), Prussian general in the Franco-Prussian War.
Hasso-Eccard Freiherr von Manteuffel (1897-1978), German general in World War II.